"Keepin' Up" is a song written by Randy Owen, Teddy Gentry, Ronnie Rogers and Greg Fowler, and recorded by American country music group Alabama.  It was released in November 1998 as the second and final single from their compilation album For the Record.  It peaked at number 14 on the country charts in the United States, and number 8 in Canada.

Critical reception
Deborah Evans Price, of Billboard magazine reviewed the song favorably, calling it a "bouncy uptempo track." She goes on to say that the song "boasts an infectious melody buoyed by Jeff Cook's guitar prowess, and of course it just doesn't get any better than Randy Owen's lead vocal."

Chart positions
"Keepin' Up" debuted at number 70 on the U.S. Billboard Hot Country Singles & Tracks for the week of December 5, 1998.

Year-end charts

References

1998 songs
Alabama (American band) songs
1998 singles
Songs written by Ronnie Rogers
Song recordings produced by Don Cook
RCA Records singles
Songs written by Randy Owen
Songs written by Teddy Gentry
Songs written by Greg Fowler